Gregory M. Wojciechowski (born 1951) is a former American amateur wrestler and professional wrestler, best known by his ring name The Great Wojo, who competed primarily for the Indianapolis-based World Wrestling Association during the 1980s, most notably being featured in the $10,000 Challenge, in which he issued an open challenge to face him in a "shoot wrestling" match with the winner receiving $10,000.

Professional wrestling career

Early life and amateur background
Born to Richard and Elaine Wojciechowski in West Toledo, Ohio, Wojciechowski began weightlifting and strength training by the age of five. As a teenager, Wojciechowski became involved in amateur wrestling competing for Whitmer High School in Toledo, Ohio, where he won the Ohio State Heavyweight Championship in 1967 and 1968.

He went to college and wrestled for the University of Toledo, later winning the NCAA Division I and All-American heavyweight championship in 1971; he was the runner-up in 1970 and 1972 (losing in 1972 to the 415-pound Chris Taylor). A protégé of Joe Scalzo and Dick Torio, he also became 4-time AAU champion in the heavyweight division winning the championship in 1970, 1971, 1974, and 1975. He also made the U.S. Olympic wrestling team in 1980, however he was unable to compete as the United States boycotted the 1980 Summer Olympics. In 1983, he published Takedown for heavyweights as part of the Wrestling Coaching Series and was later an alternate on the 1984 and 1988 U.S. Olympic wrestling teams.

Professional background
During the U.S. Olympic boycott, he began training with Dick the Bruiser and soon started wrestling for the World Wrestling Association promotion. Wrestling under the name The Great Wojo, Wojciechowski won his first title, defeating Stormy Granzig for the WWA World Heavyweight Championship in July 1984. Although losing the title to his former trainer Dick the Bruiser in January 1985, he regained the title in September 1985, ending Dick the Bruiser's final reign as WWA Champion. After successfully defending the title for almost a year, Wojciechowski lost the title to future wrestling superstar Scott Rechsteiner during the summer of 1986. Regaining the title in May 1987, he retired as champion

The $10,000 Challenge
Regularly appearing on the promotion's television program Bruiser Bedlam, Wojciechowski often offered $10,000 to any person who could pin him in the ring in a "shoot style" wrestling match. Using both his amateur and professional wrestling skills, Wojciechowski was never defeated during these bouts.

Retirement
Continuing to occasionally wrestle in the Midwest, Canada and Japan after the close of the WWA in 1993, Wojciechowski retired from active competition and began coaching high school wrestling full-time in the Toledo area including Libbey High School and later Bowsher High School. In 1999, he suffered a dissected aorta while demonstrating a wrestling move to a heavyweight student. He underwent surgery for his ripped aorta but later recovered from the operation and continued to coach high school wrestling as well as being actively involved in establishing a wrestling program in Ohio middle schools. His son Chad was the head wrestling coach at Libbey High School.

Championships and accomplishments

Professional wrestling 
George Tragos/Lou Thesz Professional Wrestling Hall of Fame
Class of 2015
 Pro Wrestling Illustrated
PWI ranked him 308 of the top 500 singles wrestlers in the PWI 500 in 1991
World Wrestling Association (Indianapolis)
WWA World Heavyweight Championship (Indianapolis version) (3 times)

Amateur wrestling  
Amateur Athletic Union (AAU)
 AAU Heavyweight Championship (4 times; 1971, 1972, 1974, 1975)

National Collegiate Athletic Association (NCAA) 
 NCAA Division I Heavyweight Championship (1 time; 1971)

Ohio High School Athletic Association (OHSAA)
 Ohio State High School Heavyweight Championship (2 times; 1967, 1968)

University of Toledo 
 University of Toledo Athletics Hall of Fame

USA Wrestling 
 U.S. Olympic Wrestling team member (1 time; 1980)
 U.S. Olympic Wrestling team alternate member (2 times; 1984, 1988)

References

External links
 

1951 births
American male professional wrestlers
American male sport wrestlers
American people of Polish descent
Living people
Professional wrestlers from Ohio